Machaerium is a genus of flowering plants in the family Fabaceae, and was recently assigned to the informal monophyletic Dalbergia clade of the Dalbergieae. It contains the following species:

 Machaerium aculeatum Raddi

 Machaerium acutifolium Vogel

 Machaerium allemanii Benth.

 Machaerium amazonense Hoehne
 Machaerium amplum Benth.
 Machaerium androvillosum F. L. R. Filardi & H. C. de Lima

 Machaerium arboreum (Jacq.) Vogel
 Machaerium aristulatum (Benth.) Ducke

 Machaerium aureiflorum Ducke
 Machaerium aureum F. L. R. Filardi & H. C. de Lima

 Machaerium berteronianum (Steud.) Urb.
 Machaerium biovulatum Micheli

 Machaerium bondaense Pittier
 Machaerium brachycarpum Pittier

 Machaerium brasiliense Vogel
 Machaerium caicarense Pittier

 Machaerium campylothyrsum Hoehne
 Machaerium cantarellianum Hoehne
 Machaerium capote Dugand
 Machaerium caratinganum Kuhlm. & Hoehne
 Machaerium castaneiflorum Ducke
 Machaerium caudatum Ducke
 Machaerium chambersii Dwyer
 Machaerium chiapense Brandegee

 Machaerium cirrhiferum Pittier—espuela de gallo
 Machaerium cobanense Donn. Sm.
 Machaerium complanatum Ducke
 Machaerium compressicaule Ducke
 Machaerium condensatum Kuhlm. & Hoehne
 Machaerium conzattii Rudd

 Machaerium costulatum Rudd

 Machaerium cultratum Pittier
 Machaerium cuspidatum Kuhlm. & Hoehne
 Machaerium cuzcoense Rudd
 Machaerium darienense Pittier
 Machaerium darlense Pittier
 Machaerium debile (Vell.) Stellfeld
 Machaerium declinatum (Vell.) Stellfeld

 Machaerium densicomum Benth.

 Machaerium dimorphandrum Hoehne
 Machaerium discolor Vogel

 Machaerium dubium (Kunth) Rudd
 Machaerium duckeanum Hoehne
 Machaerium eggersii Hoehne
 Machaerium eliasii Rudd

 Machaerium eriocarpum Benth.
 Machaerium eriostemon Benth.

 Machaerium falciforme Rudd
 Machaerium ferox (Benth.) Ducke

 Machaerium firmum (Vell.) Benth.
 Machaerium floribundum Benth.
 Machaerium floridum (Benth.) Ducke
 Machaerium fluminense Rudd
 Machaerium foliosum Rusby
 Machaerium froesii Rudd

 Machaerium fruticosum (Vell.) Hoehne
 Machaerium fulvovenosum H.C. Lima

 Machaerium glabratum Pittier
 Machaerium glabripes Pittier
 Machaerium glabrum Vogel
 Machaerium goudotii Benth.
 Machaerium gracile Benth.
 Machaerium grandifolium Pittier
 Machaerium guanaiense Rudd

 Machaerium hatschbachii Rudd

 Machaerium hirtum (Vell.) Stellfeld
 Machaerium hoehneanum Ducke
 Machaerium huanucoense Rudd
 Machaerium humboldtianum Vogel
 Machaerium incorruptibile (Vell.) Benth.

 Machaerium inundatum (Benth.) Ducke

 Machaerium isadelphum (E. Mey.) Standl.

 Machaerium jacarandifolium Rusby
 Machaerium jobimianum C. V. Mendonça & A. M. G. Azevedo
 Machaerium juglandifolium Rusby
 Machaerium kegelii Meissner
 Machaerium kuhlmannii Hoehne
 Machaerium lanatum Tul.
 Machaerium lanceolatum (Vell.) J.F. Macbr.

 Machaerium latialatum Pittier
 Machaerium latifolium Rusby

 Machaerium legale (Vell.) Benth.
 Machaerium leiocarpum Vogel
 Machaerium leiophyllum (DC.) Benth.
 Machaerium leucopterum Vogel

 Machaerium lindenianum Benth.
 Machaerium lineatum Benth.

 Machaerium longistipitatum Hoehne
 Machaerium lunatum (L. f.) Ducke

 Machaerium macaense C. V. Mendonça, A. M. G. Azevedo & H. C. Lima

 Machaerium macrophyllum Benth.
 Machaerium madeirense Pittier

 Machaerium martii Tul.
 Machaerium melanophyllum Standl.

 Machaerium microphyllum (E. Mey.) Standl.

 Machaerium milleflorum Pittier
 Machaerium millei Standl.
 Machaerium minutiflorum Tul.
 Machaerium moritzianum Benth.

 Machaerium mucronulatum Benth.
 Machaerium multifoliolatum Ducke

 Machaerium mutisii Rudd
 Machaerium myrianthum Benth.

 Machaerium nicaraguense Rudd

 Machaerium nigrum Vogel
 Machaerium nyctitans (Vell.) Benth.—canela do brejo, espuela de gallo
 Machaerium oblongifolium Vogel
 Machaerium obovatum Kuhlm. & Hoehne
 Machaerium opacum Vogel
 Machaerium orthocarpum Pittier
 Machaerium ovalifolium Rudd
 Machaerium oxyphyllum Gand.

 Machaerium paniculatum Benth.
 Machaerium papilisetosum Hoehne
 Machaerium paraense Ducke
 Machaerium paraguariense Hassl.

 Machaerium parvifolium Rudd
 Machaerium pedicellatum Vogel
 Machaerium penduliflorum Rudd
 Machaerium peruvianum J.F. Macbr.
 Machaerium pilosum Benth.
 Machaerium piresii Rudd

 Machaerium polyphyllum (Poir.) Benth.

 Machaerium pseudotipe Griseb.
 Machaerium puberulum Benth.
 Machaerium punctatum Pers.

 Machaerium quinatum (Aubl.) Sandwith
 Machaerium rectipes Pittier

 Machaerium robiniifolium (DC.) Vogel
 Machaerium robsonnianum F. L. R. Filardi & H. C. de Lima
 Machaerium rogaguense Rusby

 Machaerium salvadorense (Donn. Sm.) Rudd
 Machaerium salzmannii Benth.
 Machaerium saraense Rudd

 Machaerium scleroxylon Tul.

 Machaerium seemannii Seem.

 Machaerium sieberi Benth.

 Machaerium spicatum Kuhlm. & Hoehne
 Machaerium spinosum (Vell.) Benth.
 Machaerium splendens Vogel

 Machaerium stipitatum (DC.) Vogel
 Machaerium striatum I.M. Johnst.
 Machaerium stygium Lindm.
 Machaerium subrhombiforme Rudd

 Machaerium ternatum Kuhlm. & Hoehne

 Machaerium tolimense Rudd
 Machaerium tortipes Hoehne
 Machaerium tovarense Pittier
 Machaerium trifoliolatum Ducke
 Machaerium triste Vogel
 Machaerium truxillense Pittier

 Machaerium uncinatum (Vell.) Benth.
 Machaerium uribei Rudd
 Machaerium vellosianum Benth.

 Machaerium verrucosum Vogel
 Machaerium vestitum Vogel

 Machaerium villosum Vogel—jacarandá-do-cerrado
 Machaerium violaceo-purpureum Duchass. & Walp.
 Machaerium violaceum Vogel
 Machaerium viridipetalum Ducke
 Machaerium whitfordii J.F. Macbr.

References

 
Fabaceae genera
Taxonomy articles created by Polbot